Lotte Weeda is a romance novel by Dutch author Maarten 't Hart. It was first published in 2004. It narrates the story of the panic that starts in a village in the province of South Holland after several villagers pass away shortly after they have been depicted in a photo book.

Plot 
The narrator  is a biologist who became a local celebrity in his village, Monward, thanks to his book “The Reckless Outsider”, which describes the differences between sexual reproduction and cloning. While posing naked for a painter named Molly, he meets Lotte, a photographer who is working on a photo book of racy people in Monward. She asks the narrator to write the preface for her photo book and to give her a tour of the village. The biologist refers her to the village's young vicar, Maria, and to the owner of the beauty salon, a Somali woman called Sirena, who is a rumored transsexual. Lotte is introduced to Abel and Leonora, whose marriage is in a rocky state. Abel has delusions of Leonora being unfaithful and that none of his children from two marriages are truly his. Leonora asks the narrator whether he can identify a snake that her grandson brought from Croatia. It turns out to be a Sheltopusik, which is a harmless, legless lizard. As Abel acts increasingly mad and violent, Leonora becomes increasingly attracted to the narrator and even kisses him. The narrator is unsure of what to do about in the situation.

In the meantime, the photo book, titled “Exposure time”, has been released and is presented in Monward. After the presentation, Lotte leaves for Indonesia to document the fights in Atjeh. This is when strange things start to happen. Abel, Leonora's husband, dies from a heart attack after another fit of rage. He is depicted in the photo book, and, as it turns out, is not the only villager of Monward to have passed after having been depicted in the book. It seems that before Abel, ten other depicted villages have preceded him in death. The fact that most of them were elderly people, cannot calm the village's restlessness. Soon after a young family, who was also depicted in the book, dies in a plane crash, the rumor that everyone depicted in the book will die spreads like wildfire. Sirena, too, becomes scared and talks to the narrator about her fear of her impending death. She confesses her transsexuality and shortly after the conversation, they sleep together. A friend of Abel's, Taeke, fuels the panic surrounding the photo book by suggesting that Lotte possesses magical powers. She supposedly let the silent power of goena-goena, a form of black magic from Indonesia, loose on the village. Soon after, Taeke jumps off a bridge and passes months later in the hospital.

The narrator himself, seems unable to escape his fate of doom. When he tries to saw a colossal tree branch, he falls from the tree and almost hits the electrical saw. With death in front of his eyes his sexual relations with Sirena intensify, despite the fact that the woman's jealous boyfriend catches them in the act. The narrator has more problems. The government is working to control the widespread avian flu epidemic by putting down animals on a large scale, including backyard poultry. The narrator quickly hides six geese and an old stork. In the meantime, Lotte seems to have resurfaced. A flyer appears in the village, that seems to have been spread by Lotte, calling for donations for the victims in Atjeh. Many rich villagers donate money in the hope of averting Lotte's curse. When the narrator tries to saw tree roots, he gets stung by wasps. Normally he should have died since he is allergic to wasp stings, but he survives the incident. With this, the curse seems to have been lifted, especially when shortly after, Lotte appears in his courtyard. She has been forced to leave Indonesia and is afraid that the Indonesian secret service is targeting her. Just like the geese, Lotte gets to hide with the narrator.

Background 
The book's motto: “Only delusion is given to all” by Xenophanes provides the tone of the novel. The world is ruled by the delusion of the day. The Twin Towers of the WTC in New York City were destroyed by terrorists, Atjeh deals with a civil war, millions of animals were slaughtered because of avian flu, but in Monward, people are worried about the magical powers of a photo book. The romance novel covers many delusions. Abel is convinced his children aren't his, Taeke believes Lotte to be an Indonesian witch. An innocent lizard gets the status of a dangerous snake and police officers hunt down geese with guns. In this romance novel, ’t Hart is able to blend reality with fantasy. To do so, he remains close to home. It is not difficult to see that Monward is an anagram of Warmond, ’t Hart's current place of residence. Moreover, in 1991 he wrote the preface of a photo book “Portrets of Warmond” by photographer Els Hansen, who photographed 160 racy residents of Warmond. Naturally, the publication of Hansen's novel did not lead to the death of 160 depicted inhabitants, this is where the fiction comes in. The author shows how humanity deals with truth and lies and that one is quickly unable to recognize the difference. It's not without reason he cites Xenophanes. The quote is the motto from a fragment left by this philosopher: “And when it comes to the truth, there is and shall not be anyone who knows her in relation to the Gods and all those things I keep referring to. Because even if someone coincidentally would speak of the most perfect, then he would not be aware of this himself. Only delusion is given to all”. Moreover, the romance novel has a remarkable sexual overtone for this author. The nameless main character is surrounded by women, the painter Molly, the photographer Lotte, Leonora, the transsexual Sirena, and the female vicar Maria. They all represent the different aspects of the woman, the seductive siren, the motherly Maria, he mysterious witch Lotte, the martyr Leonora and the hateful Molly. Eventually no-one stays with the narrator except Lotte, but only to hide. But even in this case delusion rules, as she believes to be chased by the Indonesian secret service. During the entire romance novel, nightly planes to and from the airport Schiphol keep the residents awake, whose noise negatively affects the inhabitants peace of mind.

When “Lotte Weeda” was published, there was some commotion surrounding the fact that ’t Hart had basically integrated his novella “De scheltopusik”, which he wrote in 2003 as an assignment of De Bijenkorf (Dutch department store). This may have displeased some readers. On the other hand, this novella is a feast of recognition as a pre-study to this romance noval. The dog remains unnamed in this novella, like his owner, which makes his name “Anders” (translates to: ‘different’ from Dutch) in this subsequent novel a wink to faithful readers. The romance novel is ‘different’ from the novella, and yet a fitting sequel on the broadly sketched perspective.

Footnotes

References 

Novels by Maarten 't Hart
2004 novels